Russell Wood may refer to:

 Russell Wood (cricketer) (1929–2015), English cricketer
 Russell Wood (swimmer) (born 1994), Canadian swimmer
 Russell A. Wood (1880–1952), American politician